The Battle of Barren Hill was a minor engagement during the American Revolution.  On May 20, 1778, a British force attempted to encircle a smaller Continental force under the Marquis de Lafayette.  The maneuver failed, with the Continentals escaping the trap, but the British took the field.

Prelude

Contemplating the contingency of an early withdrawal by the British from occupied Philadelphia, General George Washington sent Lafayette to Barren Hill (about halfway between Valley Forge and Philadelphia) to reconnoiter British intentions, as well as to interdict British detachments foraging for food in the surrounding countryside. 
  
On May 18, Lafayette left the Valley Forge camp with 2,100 troops and five pieces of artillery. After crossing the Schuylkill River and turning south, he took up position at Barren Hill, which was close to Matson's Ford. A brigade and the guns were posted on the high ground, near a church, facing south. Another posting was at the Ridge Road to the south, and the Pennsylvania militia was sent to guard the road that led west from White Marsh. The British quickly discovered that the American force was nearby and decided to attack.

On May 19, 1778, around 10:30 p.m., Maj. Gen. James Grant and a 5,000-man British force, including 15 guns, was sent toward Barren Hill. The plan was to take a circuitous route leading to the junction of White Marsh Road and Ridge Road. This would cut off any avenue of retreat for the Americans. A body of 2,000 grenadiers and dragoons would then move along Lafayette's left flank while another group would move into position on the American right. The plan would result in the American position being encircled from 3 positions, trapping them against the river. The British force was to wait until morning to attack and destroy or capture the entire American force.

Battle 

On May 20, 1778, the British launched their attack. The militia scattered at the sight of the British troops, not offering any resistance and failing to notify Lafayette of the attack. On Ridge Road, the American group learned of the British attack. A small group was sent to fight a delaying action against the British while their commander sent word to Lafayette about the developments. After Lafayette learned of the attack, another patriot came up and told him that the British had advanced up the White Marsh Road.

Lafayette knew of another small road that led back to Matson Ford that would bypass the British force. It ran along some low ground that would conceal the Americans from the British. The British did not know about this road. Lafayette ordered his men to retreat down this road while ordering a rear guard to delay the British at the church. A few small patrols were sent to engage the British, skirmishing including the Oneida, making them think that the American force intended to stay and fight. Lafayette calmed his retreating force and slipped away with relatively few casualties.

Aftermath 
The British, having failed to bag Lafayette, resumed their retreat from Philadelphia to New York.  Washington's army shadowed Clinton on his withdrawal and forced a Battle at Monmouth on June 28, 1778, the last major battle in the North.

Notes
See report of Gen Lafayette's action at Barren Hill in the Washington Papers Gen Washington at Valley Forge, May 29, 1778 To GOUVERNEUR MORRIS

External links

 The Battle at Barren Hill—Oneida Indian Nation
 Barren Hill
 The American Friends of Lafayette
 Plan de la retraite de Barren Hill en Pensilvanie : ou un détachement de deux mille deux cent hommes sous le G'al LaFayette étois entouré par l'Armée angloise sous les G'als Howe, Clinton et Grant le 28 May 1778 / par M'r Capitaine, A.d.C. du Général LaFayette

Conflicts in 1778
1778 in the United States
Barren Hill
Barren Hill
Barren Hill
Barren Hill
History of Montgomery County, Pennsylvania
1778 in Pennsylvania
Barren Hill